Suwan Ornkerd (born 12 May 1941) is a former Thai cyclist. He competed in the team time trial at the 1964 Summer Olympics.

References

1941 births
Living people
Suwan Ornkerd
Suwan Ornkerd
Place of birth missing (living people)
Cyclists at the 1964 Summer Olympics
Suwan Ornkerd